The Parker Jotter is the Parker Pen Company's second and best-selling retracting refillable ballpoint pen. The first was the Hopalong Cassidy ballpoint. (Later a fountain pen, mechanical pencil and rollerball pen were introduced to the line). Since 1954, over 750 million have been sold worldwide. It is priced between $6 for lower end models, and $20 for higher end models, such as special editions. Its refill has a ballpoint tip originally called the T-Ball (for Tungsten), with a unique textured surface that greatly reduces slipping and failure to transfer ink onto slick paper, known as "skipping." The technology is now commonly used in the pen industry. The pens are also a popular advertising medium. The external design of the Parker T-Ball refill is a configuration copied by many other brands of refillable pens.

Description

The Jotter is distinguished by a plunger and cap made of stainless steel, a stylized arrow-shaped clip, a plastic or metal barrel  and a metal tip end. When introduced in 1954, the pen barrels were made from grooved nylon.  Approximately a year later when new colors were introduced, the barrels were manufactured from 'Hercocel W' (cellulose acetate) which was more adaptable to the needs of Parker's marketing department (it could be heat stamped, engraved or imprinted).  Originally, the barrels were produced in black, grey, green and red (rust). More colors were introduced in 1955, i.e. turquoise, coral, blue, charcoal, gold (mustard yellow) and grey-green. These colors are more difficult to find due to their relatively short production run.  Additionally there were 100,000 demonstrators manufactured in clear nylon and a white version which is somewhat of an enigma.  Some believe the white version was developed for the medical field. Others treat it as an experimental color. Whatever the case, it is rare, expensive and eagerly sought after by Jotter collectors. Shortly after introduction an additional model with a stainless steel barrel was added to the line and marketed as the Laboratory Jotter.  The first Laboratory models had a barely noticeable polished band on the upper part of the barrel.  The collector is advised to look carefully for this band to assure he or she has a true first-run production pen.  Some have exchanged the metal barrel with later production barrels that do not have this polished area and represent them as first series examples. Recently, a large number of NOS second year Jotters was found in a warehouse in Thailand.  The market was flooded with these pens, correspondingly reducing the values of certain colors of Jotters.

In over 60 + years of production, the Jotter has been produced in numerous shades, some quite rare. To date it is estimated that more than 100 different colors have been manufactured. Since the introduction of new colors has usually been tied to various promotions, it is probable that many more will be produced, creating a challenge for the collector.  A number of Jotter barrels have a marbleized appearance. They are the result of cleaning the injection molding machines and known as "lunch room" or "end of the day" specials. If a production run called for blue and the staff had been running gray barrels, the last of the gray material would blend with the blue, producing a blended color barrel. At one time, the company explored the idea of producing these blended barrels, but the concept was never introduced.

The so-called "girl's" Jotter was a smaller version of the original. It was manufactured in the early 1960s and was popular for a time. It came in several colors including black, navy blue, at least three different shades of light blue (teal), bright red, orange, yellow, orange, white, at least two shades of gray, brown, dark and olive green, as well as a clear "demonstrator".  Surprisingly, a dark red or maroon version does not appear to have been produced.

Management was always trying to expand the market for the Jotter and commissioned the design department to explore new designs and materials. Additionally, employees submitted ideas and models for consideration.  Several of these prototypes or concepts exist in ex-employees' private collections.  When available, they command premium prices.

Additionally, the Jotter has been manufactured in Canada, England, France, Australia, Brazil, West Germany, Peru, Columbia, Mexico, India, China and Argentina. The Jotters manufactured in some of these countries are difficult to find and command higher values than the United States or English versions. Their place of manufacture is usually on the pen's cap.

The refill comes in ball-pen and gel styles in multiple colors, as well as in three point sizes. Early in the history of the pen, refills were also available in extra fine and extra extra fine, but were soon discontinued. Boxed sets have been manufactured since inception and are also considered collectible.

History 
The Jotter ballpen was first released in 1954. The model had an inverted "V" style clip without the arrow engraving. The 1954 Jotter came with red, green, light gray, dark gray and black barrels, made of grooved nylon, not smooth plastic. The following year, because of the popularity of the pen, the choice of colors was extended to include bright red, mustard yellow, bright green and bright orange. These later colors are more difficult to find now. There are also cap variations resulting from differences in imprints, most noticeably the introduction of the Parker arrow logo and two sizes of the "MADE IN USA" imprint. Towards the end of production, smooth barrels were introduced without a metal tip. These proved to be prone to splitting and a metal tip was incorporated to improve durability.  These barrels are also found with the early so-called "21" variety.

In 1956, the company made the Jotter barrel smooth plastic and changed the clip to the "21" style.  This clip used a reversed "V" rather than an inverted one and incorporated a ball on the clip for pocket retention. This clip remained in use for approximately two years. During the period this variation was in production a metal barrel end (or tip) was added in response to complaints that the early plastic tip broke from pressure. Examples without the metal tip and the "21" clip are relatively rare.  There are also some examples of the grooved nylon barrel being mated to the "21" clip and the inverted clip being mated to smooth barrels without tips. One can only conjecture that this was an effort on the part of the factory to use up surplus parts from different series. Barrels and caps were all interchangeable during this period. and 3rd edition barrels (c. 1963 up) have been found fitted to the "21" caps because of the ease of attaching them. These barrels are of slightly smaller diameter.  Collectors have added these incorrect barrels because they were manufactured in several colors unavailable at the time. These colors demand higher prices for this edition of the Jotter. Before acquiring a "21" mode, one should establish that the attached barrel is the larger diameter if concerned about accuracy and authenticity.  It is suggested that the collector should acquire a sample of both sized refills and test the inside diameter of the barrel.  The newer and more colorful barrels will not accept the larger diameter refills.

During this period (1956–1970) a Jotter was introduced with a substantially larger diameter barrel. Most found to date have an unusual moss green barrel.  Black and white versions of the large diameter Jotter have also been found. This model was known as the "Industrial Jotter" as opposed to the standard diameter version known as the "Commercial Jotter". Parker's sales staff never liked the original Jotter because the grooves made advertising imprints on the barrel difficult, if not impossible, to print and required clip devices when sold for advertising purposes. They were pleased when the smooth barrel was introduced which appeared to allow advertising imprints.  However it was then found that imprinting on the smooth tapered barrel was equally difficult due to the taper of the barrel. Subsequently, the marketing department successfully lobbied for a model with a larger diameter barrel which would make it possible to easily print corporate messages.  This larger diameter adversely affected the overall appearance of the pen, causing the pen to lose its svelte design.  The version was not popular with the staff or customers and was discontinued (after a short period of time) when Parker solved the problem of imprinting on the original tapered barrel. These industrial versions are seldom seen and can be recognized by the sharp taper at the end of the pen barrel. When found these pens command a substantial premium over the standard Jotters of the period.

In 1957, the company launched the T-Ball refill, which contained reformulated ink and a textured tungsten carbide writing ball. One year later, the company added an arrow to replace the ball-clip design. The arrow has remained on all production Jotters since then. When introduced the arrow was without quills.  Shortly thereafter, the quills were introduced, making the plain arrow models somewhat rare and commanding a premium in the market place. These pens are not to be confused with the 50th anniversary pens introduced in 2004. At some point, the interior diameter of the Jotter was reduced and a new refill introduced. There are two barrel variations, the large diameter version and the smaller diameter version.  Some pens have been found with early caps fitted to the later small diameter barrels and represented as rarities. Additionally, there are several cap variations resulting from changing the imprints on the cap. The period from 1958 to 1973 saw many slight design changes, making it difficult for the collector to obtain a representative example of each production specimen.

In 1965, the company introduced Jotter desk pens in both metal and metal-and-plastic versions. In 1973, the company flattened the dome-shaped plunger and placed an imprint of the Parker logo on the plunger. By the 1980s, the company changed the inner cap threads from brass to plastic. At that time, date codes on the cap were introduced.

In 2000, the plunger was modified to illustrate the new company logo. This is to be found mainly on UK versions, although a few pens manufactured in the USA have these buttons. In 2004, the Jotter's Golden Jubilee, the company released a number of special editions. The flat button was restored to its original rounded shape that it had prior to 1973 and was imprinted with the number '50' signifying  the pen's fiftieth anniversary of production. This button was used for only one year.  Several new colors were introduced and the special edition pens were attractively finished in sterling silver and lacquer or a new process, the name of which is unknown.  The plain anniversary clips have been seen attached to later barrels, and earlier and later plungers attached to later caps, creating even more variations. Earlier colors have been found with later caps indicating that Parker was cleaning out their old inventory. In 2009 Parker again changed their logo to resemble the older arrow logo.  Plungers were revised and they were no longer imprinted with the corporate logo.

There is a series of 24K gold-plated versions with plastic barrels. They have been found in several colors. There is another variation from England that has gold clips attached to stainless caps and plastic barrels with chrome tips. These are in addition to the traditional  versions with a gold clip and tip referred to as the 'GT' or Gold Top.  The factory also issued a number of variations using left-over inventory.

Today's Jotters are similar to the popular "ruggedized" version that first came out in 1954 when Parker salesmen stood on the nylon barrel to show its durability. Production has continued at Parker's plant in Newhaven, England, after being transferred there from Janesville, Wisconsin, USA, in 1999. Parker closed its factory in England late in 2010 and production was moved to Nantes, France. Jotters are now imprinted with "Made in France". Additionally, some Parker products are produced under license in India and China for consumption in South and East Asia. Jotters from India are commonly found for sale on eBay. Chinese production models are now seen in the large office supply stores.

In April 2016 Parker significantly updated the line, introducing a new core range and premium range. Both feature metal barrels, in a variety of colours, named after London Underground stations. Both ranges feature a new clip with an updated arrow design, while the premium range complements this with more intricate designs on the cap portion of the pen. In 2017 the company introduced a set of four XL models, each of a 7% larger diameter and length using the standard Parker-style ballpoint refill. For a number of years, Parker has annually marketed a special set of Jotters, usually in different colors from the standard offerings.

See also

 Parker 51
 Parker Jointless
 Parker Vacumatic
 Parker Duofold
 Quink 
 Ballpoint pen
 Writing implement

References

 David Shepard, Graham Hogg, George Parker, Dan Zazove (2010), Jotter - History Of An Icon, Surrenden Pens. 
 L. Graham Hogg, (2007), 55 Years of The Parker Ballpoint Pen, LGH Publications-UK.  
 Regina Martini, (1996)Pens & Pencils - A Collector's Handbook, Translated from the German, Schiffer Publishing Ltd.   (paper)
 Henry Gostony, Stuart Schneider (1998), The Incredible Ball Point Pen, Schiffer Publishing Ltd.

External links

 

Parker pens
Products introduced in 1954